Cleethorpes Rugby Union Football Club is an English rugby union team based in Cleethorpes, North East Lincolnshire. Established in 1979, the first XV currently plays in Midlands 4 East (North) following their promotion as champions of Midlands 5 East (South) at the end of the 2017-18 season. The club runs two senior sides and seven junior sides. Cleethorpes play their home games at Taylor's Avenue, and their previous grounds include Lucarly's and Lindsey School Rugby Pitches. The club's home colours are navy, gold, and white. They get their nickname of 'The Meggies' from the nickname for the residents of the town.

History
The club was established in 1979 when a group of schoolteachers from Lindsey School, led by Ian Brown, Lee Stephens, and Ron Duffield, were annoyed by the fact that after their students left school, they gave up rugby. They invited players to a meeting at Cleethorpes Cricket Club and Cleethorpes Rugby Club was born. The club's first competitive game took place at RAF Waddington, against a team fielded by the air base. Cleethorpes lost this match, the final score being 29-10. During the 1990s, the club experienced a decline. During this period, it could only turn out one team. However, the club held many charity events during this period, such as publishing a Calendar Girls-style calendar. In recent years, the club have experienced better fortunes, now being able to turn out two senior sides, and several junior sides. The first XV were relegated in the 2015-16 season to the Midlands 5 East (North) after lingering around the bottom half of the Midlands 4 East (North) for a number of seasons.

Personnel

Club Officials
President:  John Grey
Chairman:   Kev Davison
Secretary:  Phillip Cass

Honours
Notts, Lincs & Derbyshire 4 champions (2): 1988–89, 1994–95
Notts, Lincs & Derbyshire 3 champions: 1997–98
Midlands 5 East (North) champions (2): 2007–08, 2017–18

Notes

References

External links

Cleethorpes
Rugby union in Lincolnshire
English rugby union teams